Kepler Launch Site is a site for the launch of low and medium power model rockets south of Weil der Stadt in Germany at . Kepler Launch Site, which is named in honor of the astronomer Johannes Kepler born in 1571 in Weil der Stadt, was founded in 2001 on the area of a former site of midsummer fire celebrations, which was abandoned a few years ago. From Kepler Launch Site rockets with maximum altitudes up to 3 kilometers can be launched.

Kepler Launch Site is the favorite launch area for model rocket enthusiasts in the Stuttgart area.

Rocket launch sites in Germany
Geography of Baden-Württemberg